1992 World Cup may refer to:

1992 Cricket World Cup
1989–1992 Rugby League World Cup
1992 Alpine Skiing World Cup
1992 IAAF World Cup